The Cleveland mayoral election of 1941 saw the election of Frank Lausche, who defeated incumbent mayor Edward J. Blythin, who had assumed the office when Harold Hitz Burton resigned as mayor to take a seat in the United States Senate.

General election

References

Mayoral elections in Cleveland
Cleveland mayoral
Cleveland
November 1941 events
1940s in Cleveland